Ruhul Amin (born 1971) is a British film director.

Ruhul Amin may also refer to:

 Mohammad Ruhul Amin (1934–1971), Bangladesh Navy officer, killed during the Bangladesh Liberation War
 BNS Shaheed Ruhul Amin, a ship
 M. M. Ruhul Amin (1942–2017), 16th Chief Justice of Bangladesh
 Ruhul Amin (Bangladeshi film director) (1940–2013)
 Ruhul Amin (Kurigram politician), Bangladeshi politician
 Ruhul Amin (Patuakhali politician), Bangladeshi politician